Hallenbarter is a surname. Notable people with the surname include:

 Konrad Hallenbarter (born 1953), Swiss cross country skier
 Simon Hallenbarter (born 1979), Swiss biathlete